Vyskytná is a municipality and village in Pelhřimov District in the Vysočina Region of the Czech Republic. It has about 800 inhabitants.

Administrative parts
Villages of Branišov and Sedliště are administrative parts of Vyskytná.

History
The first written mention of Vyskytná is from 1352. The village was originally a town, which was devastated during the Hussite Wars.

Sights
The Church of the Name of the Virgin Mary was built in the Gothic style in 1290.

References

Villages in Pelhřimov District